The 31st Annual Gotham Awards, presented by the Gotham Film & Media Institute (previously Independent Filmmaker Project), were held on November 29, 2021. The nominees were announced on October 21, 2021. Actors Peter Dinklage and Kristen Stewart, director Jane Campion, film executive Eamonn Bowles, playwright Kathleen Collins, and the cast of The Harder They Fall  all received tribute awards. Collins received her tribute award posthumously.

Ceremony information
Starting with this ceremony, the awards for Best Actor and Best Actress were replaced by two new, gender neutral award categories: Outstanding Lead Performance and Outstanding Supporting Performance. Furthermore, a gender neutral award category for acting in a series, called Outstanding Performance in a New Series, was added. These three new categories each have up to ten nominees instead of the usual five. In addition to these changes to the acting categories, an award for Breakthrough Nonfiction Series was created for this ceremony.

Winners and nominees

Film

Television

Special awards

Director's Tribute
Jane Campion

Ensemble Tribute
The Harder They Fall – Zazie Beetz, Deon Cole, RJ Cyler, Danielle Deadwyler, Idris Elba, Edi Gathegi, Regina King, Delroy Lindo, Jonathan Majors, Lakeith Stanfield and Damon Wayans Jr.

Icon Tribute
Kathleen Collins (posthumously)

Impact Salute
Actors Fund of America

Industry Tribute
Eamonn Bowles

Performer Tribute
Peter Dinklage
Kristen Stewart

References

External links
 

2021 film awards
2021